Vikramam is a village in the Pattukkottai taluk of Thanjavur district, Tamil Nadu, India.

Demographics 

As per the 2001 census, Vikramam had a total population of 3824 with 1854 males and 1970 females. The sex ratio was 1063. The literacy rate was 69.11,with a large number of people residing at the state capital-Chennai, Singapore, Malaysia, U.A.E or U.S.

References 

 

Villages in Thanjavur district